(DDR) is a music video game series produced by Konami. Introduced in Japan in 1998 as part of the Bemani series, and released in North America and Europe in 1999, Dance Dance Revolution is the pioneering series of the rhythm and dance genre in video games. Players stand on a "dance platform" or stage and hit colored arrows laid out in a cross with their feet to musical and visual cues. Players are judged by how well they time their dance to the patterns presented to them and are allowed to choose more music to play to if they receive a passing score.

Dance Dance Revolution has been met with critical acclaim for its originality and stamina in the video game market, as well as popularizing the use of videogames as a medium for fitness and exercise. There have been dozens of arcade-based releases across several countries and hundreds of home video game console releases, promoting a music library of original songs produced by Konami's in-house artists and an eclectic set of licensed music from many different genres. The game is also known for its passionate fanbase, as well as its growing competitive tournament scene. The DDR series has also inspired similar games such as Pump it Up by Andamiro and In the Groove by Roxor Games.

The series' current arcade version is Dance Dance Revolution A3, released on March 17, 2022.

Gameplay

The core gameplay involves the player stepping their feet to correspond with the arrows that appear on the screen and the beat. During normal gameplay, arrows scroll upwards from the bottom of the screen and pass over a set of stationary arrows near the top (referred to as the "guide arrows" or "receptors", officially known as the Step Zone). When the scrolling arrows overlap the stationary ones, the player must step on the corresponding arrows on the dance platform, and the player has been given a judgment for their accuracy of every streaked note (From highest to lowest: Marvelous, Perfect, Great, Good, Almost, Miss).

Additional arrow types were added in later mixes. Freeze Arrows, introduced in MAX, are long green arrows that must be held down until they completely travel through the Step Zone. Each of these arrows awards an "O.K.!" if successfully pressed or an "N.G." when the arrow is released too quickly. An "N.G." decreases the life bar and, starting with X, also breaks any existing combo. X also introduced Shock Arrows, walls of arrows with lightning effects that must be avoided, which will award an "O.K.!" if successfully avoided or an "N.G." if any of the dancer's panels are stepped on. An "N.G." for shock arrows has the same consequences found with freeze arrows, but hitting a shock arrow additionally hides future steps for a short period.

Successfully hitting the arrows in time with the music fills the "Dance Gauge", or life bar, while failure to do so drains it. If the Dance Gauge is fully exhausted during gameplay, the player will fail the song, and the game will be over. Otherwise, the player is taken to the Results Screen, which rates the player's performance with a letter grade and a numerical score, among other statistics. The player may then be given a chance to play again, depending on the settings of the particular machine. The default limit is three songs, though operators can set the limit between one and five.

Aside from play style Single, Dance Dance Revolution provides two other play styles: Versus, where two players can play Single simultaneously, and Double, where one player uses all eight panels. Before the 2013 release of Dance Dance Revolution, some games offer additional modes, such as Course mode (players must play a set of songs back-to-back) and Battle mode (two players compete with a tug-of-war life bar by sending distracting modifiers to each other). Earlier versions also have Couple/Unison Mode, where two players must cooperate to play the song. Course Mode was reintroduced to the series starting with A20.

Difficulty
Depending on the edition of the game, dance steps are broken into various levels of difficulty, often by color. The difficulty is separated into two to five categories, depending on the game:

The first release of Dance Dance Revolution established two difficulties: Basic for Single and Double modes, and Another for Single mode only. Each chart is rated with a level from 1 to 7, and every release through 3rdMix Plus also attributed a title to each level number. The Internet Ranking Version added Another for Double mode, and a new higher difficulty of Maniac for Single mode only, along with several level 8 charts, titled Exorbitant. 2ndMix Club Version 2 introduced several level 9 charts, titled Catastrophic until 3rdMix Plus and Evolutionary in X3 vs. 2ndMix. The Maniac difficulty was renamed SSR and expanded to Double mode for new songs in 3rdMix, with the name reverting to Maniac in 3rdMix Plus. Beginning with 4thMix, all songs featured the Maniac difficulty in Single and Double mode. 4thMix Plus introduced new Maniac charts for 16 songs, while the original Maniac charts were labelled Maniac-S and Maniac-D in this game, with only the new charts remaining in 5thMix.

DDRMAX introduced the "Groove Radar", showing how difficult a particular sequence was in various categories, such as the maximum density of steps. This release removed the level numbers, and among the 42 songs, two ("Flash in the Night" and "Follow Me") have never received any level numbers due to being DDRMAX exclusives. Beginning with DDRMAX2, level numbers were reintroduced, along with a level 10 for "MAX 300" and "MAXX Unlimited". Level 10 was titled Revolutionary in X3 vs. 2ndMix. DDRMAX2 also introduced the Challenge difficulty with "Kakumei" ("革命") on One More Extra Stage, and in 19 Nonstop Challenge exclusive songs. Dance Dance Revolution Extreme introduced the Beginner difficulty, which premiered in Dancing Stage EuroMix, as the game's easiest difficulty. It is only available in Single mode, except in the Dance Dance Revolution Universe series for the Xbox 360, which offers Beginner difficulty in Single and Double modes. Extreme features a total of 37 songs with the Challenge difficulty.

On X, the level numbers were overhauled, now ranking songs on a scale of 1-20, the first 10 represented by yellow bars, and the second 10 represented by additional red blocks shown in place of yellow bars. All songs from previous versions were re-rated on the new scale. The same system was carried over to X2, although the difficulty bars were removed, replaced by simple difficulty numbers with the foot mark returning as the difficulty symbol for the first time since SuperNOVA. There is currently no song that is officially rated maximum (20); the highest rating available in 19, shared between seven songs: "POSSESSION" on Double Challenge, and "EGOISM 440", "ENDYMION", "Lachryma《Re: Queen’M》", "MAX 360", "Over The "Period", "PARANOiA Revolution", and "Valkyrie dimension" on Single Challenge and Double Challenge. However, the game still allows players to rate their custom edit data up to the maximum.

Groove Radar

The foot-rating system was completely removed for the 6th Mix, and replaced by the Groove Radar. The Groove Radar is a graphical representation of the difficulty of a song based in five different areas: Stream, Voltage, Air, Chaos, and Freeze.

 Stream - Indicates the overall density of the steps of the song. A high number of steps is a factor too, but not necessary for a high stream measurement.
 Voltage - Indicates the peak density of the steps (the highest density of arrows that ever appear on the screen at once). Songs with a high BPM (300 or more) usually have a high voltage measurement, since it allows more steps to appear in increasingly halved beats (8th step in a 300 BPM song equals to 4th beat step in a 150 BPM song, and so on), though songs with lower BPM can have a high voltage, even if the halved beats usually cap at 32nd beat (64th beat steps exist in very few songs).
 Chaos - Indicates "off-beat" steps; those that do not occur in 4th or 8th beats. 
 Air - Indicates the number of double steps (i.e. jumps) and shock arrows within the song.
 Freeze - Indicates the number of freeze arrows within the song

Each game usually has a song that maxes out a category within the radar. If a song in a following mix or update has a higher category measurement, then the groove radar is renewed so the new song can max out that category, while all previous songs are re-rated in respect to the new radar.

As of DDR 2014, the groove radar also employs a numerical measurement in addition to a graphical representation. Before the update, the radar did not disclose the number by default, though it could be shown by holding the SELECT button while heading to the song select screen.

The Groove Radar was not very popular among seasoned DDR veterans. The foot-rating system was restored to work with the Groove Radar in the North American home version of the game and the next arcade version, MAX2, and almost all future versions (except for versions based on the North American version of EXTREME, which only used foot ratings). All of the MAX songs on MAX2 received foot-ratings, excluding songs that were removed.

SuperNOVA 2 featured special edits of songs specifically meant to max out specific categories on the radar, culminating with "DEAD END ("GROOVE RADAR" Special)", maxing out all 5 categories. While not related, SuperNOVA 2 also featured a variation known as "My Groove Radar" as part of e-Amusement, which was also divided into five categories, though it was meant to measure the player's stats on songs rather than showing the song's difficulty.

Extra Stage system
The Extra Stage, originally introduced in 1stMIX and reintroduced in MAX, rewards a player for clearing three songs, either with a high enough grade on the final stage or by fulfilling specific play requirements. The player receives the opportunity to play a free extra song, which often defaults to a very difficult song with forced modifiers (such as 1.5x speed and Reverse) and LIFE4 since DDR X2, a life bar identical to the battery bar similar to Challenge mode with 1-4 lives depending on their score in the final stage in SuperNOVA 2 and X, or a non-regaining life bar before SuperNOVA 2. Beginning on SuperNOVA 2, players may be able to access the modifier menu (LIFE GAUGE is disabled) and the forced modifiers (save for battery bar or LIFE4) are no longer used. However, the Replicant-D Action event in X2 and since DDR 2014 did not allow players to select modifiers for its Encore Extra Stage.

Before EXTREME, the Extra Stage song was predetermined. Afterward, any song can be played for the Extra Stage, although there is still a song designated as the Extra Stage (usually marked with red letters on the song wheel, or contained within the EXTRA EXCLUSIVE folder. In all cases (etc. in EXTRA EXCLUSIVE songs), they must be unlocked for regular play). A player who attains a grade of "AA" (or "A" in SuperNOVA or 950.000 Supernova 2 points in A) on the Extra Stage is invited to play an additional stage, "One More Extra Stage" (OMES, or Encore Extra Stage post-SuperNOVA), with another special song option, played in RISKY, in which any combo-breaking step or missed freeze will cause an instant failure. Since X3 VS 2ndMIX, some Encore Extra Stage songs are marked as "ATTACK PERFECT FULL COMBO", where any judgment less than Perfect will cause the player to fail the song. Unlike Extra Stages, the song for Encore Extra Stages remains predetermined, the only exceptions were SuperNOVA 2 and X, which allowed players to play any song for their Encore Extra Stage. Usually, if this final boss is beaten, a special credits sequence is played.

With the implementation of e-Amusement in DDR, mixes after SuperNOVA have contained multiple songs as extra stages, often based on specific conditions, such as playing specific difficulties or songs.

From MAX2 onward, the BPM of Extra Stage songs is displayed as a random, changing number, instead of the song's true BPM to hide it from players, also when KAKUMEI was played as an Encore Extra Stage, its Groove Radar data is hidden by continually animating through random songs' ratings.  The random BPM display is replaced with the normal BPM display in the next mix, and as of X, after the said song has been unlocked for normal play.

Hardware
A standard Dance Dance Revolution arcade machine consists of two parts, the cabinet and the dance platform. The cabinet has a wide bottom section, which houses large floor speakers and glowing neon lamps (led on X cabinets and hide lights on white cabinets). Above this sits a narrower section that contains the monitor, and on top is a lighted marquee graphic, with two small speakers and flashing lights on either side. Below the monitor are two sets of buttons (one for each player), each consisting of two triangular selection buttons (four on X and white cabinets) and a center rectangular button, used mainly to confirm a selection or start the game.

The dance stage is a raised metal platform divided into two sides. Each side houses a set of four acrylic glass pads arranged and pointing in the orthogonal directions (left, up, down and right), separated by metal squares. Each pad sits atop four pressure activated switches, one at each edge of each pad, and a software-controlled cold cathode lamp illuminating the translucent pad, not available on the white cabinet. A metal safety bar in the shape of an upside-down "U" is mounted to the dance stage behind each player. Some players make use of this safety bar to help maintain proper balance, and to relieve weight from the legs so that arrows can be pressed with greater speed and accuracy.

Some DDR cabinets are equipped with Sony PlayStation memory card slots, allowing the player to insert a compatible memory card before starting a game and save their high scores to the card. Additionally, the equivalent home versions of DDR allow players to create and save custom step patterns (edits) to their memory card — the player can then play those steps on the arcade machine if the same song exists on that machine. This feature is supported in 2ndMix through Extreme. On the DDR X announce, these slots are replaced by USB slots and the players required create edits from Japanese PlayStation 2's DDR X and transferred onto the DDR X arcades onwards. SuperNova series and white cabinets didn't support memory card slots. However, it introduced Konami's internet based link system e-Amusement to the series, which can save stats and unlocks for individual players (but cannot store edits). This functionality however, could only be used in Japan. During the North American release of Dance Dance Revolution SuperNOVA 2, an e-Amuse capable machine was made available at a Brunswick Zone Arcade in Naperville, Illinois. This machine was hosted on a different network than the Japanese version, and the only other machine on the network was located in Konami's American branch in El Segundo, California. e-Amusement functionality would later be made available in North America with the release of Dance Dance Revolution A.

The Solo arcade cabinet is smaller and contains only one dance pad, modified to include six arrow panels instead of four (the additional panels are "upper-left" and "upper-right"). These pads generally don't come with a safety bar, but include the option for one to be installed at a later date. The Solo pad also lacks some of the metal plating that the standard pad has, which can make stepping difficult for players who are used to playing on standard machines. An upgrade was available for Solo machines called the "Deluxe pad", which was closer to the standard cabinet's pad. Additionally Solo machines only incorporate two sensors, located horizontally in the center of the arrow, instead of four sensors (one on each edge).

On January 14, 2019, Konami revealed a new "20th Anniversary Model" cabinet redesign, featuring gold-colored plating, a larger screen, and updated dance pad LED lighting.

Dance Dance Revolution normally runs at 240p, up to and including Extreme. 4thMix to Extreme use 480i when displaying menus.
On CRT-based cabinets, card readers are optional. PlayStation memory cards are supported in Asia from 2ndMix Link Edition to Extreme. PlayStation 2 card support for SuperNova worldwide was announced, but cancelled. SuperNova and newer support e-Amusement instead. DDR X and its sequel also support USB drives.
Unofficially, this cabinet can be upgraded to support newer mixes, such as DDR Extreme and SuperNova 2.
This cabinet was first demonstrated at a private JAEPO 2019 conference. It displayed a 20th anniversary title screen, and gameplay was not allowed. During the 8th Konami Arcade Championship (KAC), the DDR finalists played on a gold cabinet running Dance Dance Revolution A.

Dance Dance Revolution 2ndMix was updated after its initial release with a few new songs and the ability to connect to and play alongside Konami's DJ simulator games, Beatmania IIDX. While the official name of that version of DDR when alone was Dance Dance Revolution 2ndMix Link Version, when connected to the two Beatmania IIDX cabinets it was compatible with it was referred to by two other unique names.

System boards
The first Dance Dance Revolution as well as its followup DDR 2ndMix uses Bemani System 573 Analog as its hardware. DDR 3rdMix replaces this with a Bemani System 573 Digital board, which would be used up to DDR Extreme. Both of these are based on the PlayStation.

Beginning with Dancing Stage Fusion in 2005, the hardware is replaced by Bemani Python, a PlayStation 2-based hardware. DDR SuperNova, released in 2006, utilised a Bemani Python 2 board, originally found in GuitarFreaks V and Drummania V. Bemani Python 2 would also be used in the followup DDR SuperNova 2.

Along with the cabinet change, DDR X also changes its hardware to the PC-based Bemani PC Type 4. This more powerful hardware allows for high definition graphics and enhanced features. With DDR A, Bemani PC Type 4 is replaced by ADE-704A (ADE-6291 for 20th Anniversary cabinets only), that is still used to this day.

ReleasesDance Dance Revolution has been released in many different countries on many different platforms. Originally released in Japan as an arcade game and then a PlayStation game, which was a bestseller. DDR was later released in North American, Europe, Korea, the whole of Asia, Australia, New Zealand, South America and Mexico on multiple platforms including the PlayStation 2, Xbox, Wii, and many others. Due to demand, Japanese versions of the game, which are usually different from the games released in other countries, are often imported or bootlegged. DDR fansites make an attempt to keep track of the locations of arcade machines throughout the major regions.

Home releases

DDR games have been released on various video game consoles, including the PlayStation, Dreamcast, Nintendo 64, PlayStation 2, PlayStation 3, GameCube, Wii, Xbox and Xbox 360, and even PCs. Home versions often contain new songs, songs from the arcade version, and additional features that take advantage of the capabilities of the console (e.g.; Xbox 360 versions such as the Dance Dance Revolution Universe series include support for online multiplayer and downloadable songs over Xbox Live, and high definition graphics). DDR has even reached Nintendo's Game Boy Color, with five versions of Dance Dance Revolution GB released in Japan; these included a series of three mainstream DDR games, a Disney Mix, and an Oha Star. The games come with a small thumb pad that fits over the Game Boy Color's controls to simulate the dance pad.

Home versions are commonly bundled with soft plastic dance pads that are similar in appearance and function to the Nintendo Power Pad. Some third-party manufacturers produce hard metal pads at a higher price.

Three version of DDR was also produced for the PC, and the 1st is released in North America. It uses the interface of Dance Dance Revolution 4thMix, and contains around 40 songs from the first six mainstream arcade releases. It has not been as well received as the console versions.

A last PC version of DDR, called Dance Dance Revolution Grand Prix, was also produced in Japan. It uses the interface of Dance Dance Revolution A20 PLUS, and contains 6 licences, 9 revival licences, and over 800 songs from all mainstream arcade releases.

DDR has also seen a number of mobile game releases on Apple iOS and Android platforms, including Dance Dance Revolution S. It was announced alongside several other adaptations of Konami franchises to the iOS platform in January 2009. A free preview version was also released, Dance Dance Revolution S Lite, which features one song and served as a preview for the final version and as a demo. The final version was released in the Japanese App Store on February 27, 2009. Dance Dance Revolution S+, a sequel with in-app song purchasing, was released the same year.

Similar games

Due to the success of the Dance Dance Revolution franchise, many other games with similar or identical gameplay have been created.

Commercial competitors of DDR include the Korean series Pump It Up and the American series In the Groove by Roxor Games, as well as TechnoMotion by F2 Systems, EZ2Dancer by Amuseworld, and MC Groovz Dance Craze by Mad Catz.In the Groove was met with legal action by Konami and resulted in Konami's acquisition of the game's intellectual property.

A Christian version of DDR, named Dance Praise, has been made by Digital Praise. Ubisoft produced a dance game based on Disney's The Jungle Book titled The Jungle Book Groove Party.

Fan-made versions of DDR have also been created, many freely available to the public under open source licenses. The most popular of these is StepMania, upon which the game In the Groove is based. These simulators allow for players to create and play their own songs to their own programmed steps. As a result, many DDR fans have held contests and released "mixes" of custom songs and steps for these simulators. Notably the Japanese Foonmix series and the DDR East Invasion Tournamix competitions. Other simulators include Dance with Intensity and pyDance for Windows, both of which are no longer developed, and Feet of Fury, a homebrew game for the Sega Dreamcast.

Besides direct clones, many other games have been released that center around rhythm and dance due to DDRs popularity. Dance! Online released by Acclaim combines dance pad play with an MMO element. ABC's Dancing With the Stars and Codemasters' Dance Factory are more recent examples of games that pay homage to DDR and the genre it created. Konami uses music from its other rhythm game series such as Beatmania and Beatmania IIDX, Drummania, GuitarFreaks, and Pop'n Music, as well as making references to DDR in its other games and vice versa.

Dance Dance Revolution today
Tournaments are held worldwide, with participants usually competing for higher scores or number of Perfect/Marvelous steps (referred to previously as "Perfect Attack" tournaments, now more commonly known as "Marvelous Attack" or "MA tournaments"). Less common are "freestyle" tournaments, where players develop actual dance routines to perform while following the steps in the game.

Playing styles
Many DDR players, in order to get better scores by focusing on timing and pattern reading, will minimize any extraneous body movement during gameplay. These players are commonly referred to as "technical", "tech" or "perfect attack" (PA) players. These technical players usually play the most difficult songs on the highest difficulty levels in an attempt to perfect their scores, and the most elite players are able to get perfect or near perfect scores on all of the hardest songs in the game. The more "technical" a song gets the more the player must use minimalistic movements in order to hit all the arrows with perfection. These players perfect using their heels as well and often hold on to the bar to take weight off their feet enabling them to move faster and tire more slowly. This style of play is the focus of most competitions.

Other DDR players choose to incorporate complex or flashy techniques into their play movements, and some of these "freestyle" players develop intricate dance routines to perform during a song. Freestyle players tend to choose songs on lower difficulty levels, so that the player is not restricted in their movements by large quantities of required steps. Some players can even dance facing away from the screen.

Somewhere in the middle are the players which choose to do a little bit of both of the formers. There are criticisms of the In The Groove style of play which focuses on "perfect attack". More traditional players say it takes the fun away from the game the harder the step-charts get, which makes players use much less movement overall to conserve stamina. By doing this, it is no longer a dance game and many arrows do not fit perfectly with the beat because there are simply too many of them. The middle players enjoy moving to the beat and still trying to improve their scores without having to adopt the In the Groove style of play.

A freestyling act can also involve performing other stunts while playing. On an episode of ABC's short-lived series Master of Champions, Billy Matsumoto won the episode when he played 5th Mix's "Can't Stop Fallin' In Love (Speed Mix)" on Heavy mode while juggling three lit torches.

As an esport
In 2004, Dance Dance Revolution became an official sporting event in Norway. The first official club, DDR Oslo, was founded in 2004. The tournaments in Norway were divided into two parts, first there was a group play where the 2 or 3 best players from each group went to the final rounds. Elimination of the player with the lowest game score was used for each round in the finals. The scoring system used was based on people dancing to 2 or 3 songs. Some of the songs were selected randomly and had to be played by everyone.  The others were player-chosen, which introduced some strategy into the game, as some songs had higher possible scoring than others. Dancing Stage EuroMix 2 was used for the Norwegian tournaments.

In recent years, Dance Dance Revolution has been promoted by Konami as an esport, mainly through their own competitive tournament, the Konami Arcade Championship. The tournament allows players in different regions around the world to sign up and play in specific online events to earn a spot in the grand finals, typically held in Tokyo, Japan. The first iterations of the tournament were limited only to competitors in Japan. In subsequent years, players from Korea, Taiwan, and other Asian countries were allowed to enter. The 6th Annual tournament, which concluded on February 11, 2017, was notable for being the first time that competitors from the United States were eligible to enter. The 7th Annual event, which concluded on February 10, 2018, added Indonesia and Canada as eligible competitor regions.

The 9th Annual Konami Arcade Championship added eligibility for players in Australia and New Zealand. The finals took place on February 8, 2020, and resulted in Chris Chike winning the global tournament.

Community-run DDR esports tournaments have gained traction since 2017, and have been growing in popularity and participation every year since, particularly in North America after the release of Dance Dance Revolution A. Recently, DDR has been featured as part of the CEO game tournament event. DDR is also the main event in the annual rhythm game tournament event, The Big Deal, taking place in Dallas, Texas. The 2019 event was historic for being the largest in-person DDR tournament in the game's history. In March 2023, the first ever upbeat tournament was held at Round1 in Denver, Colorado, with a $10,000 prize pool, the largest in any DDR esports competition to date. upbeat also set the record for the largest ever viewing audience on Twitch for any DDR tournament on the streaming platform.

In 2022, Konami announced a big expansion to its official BEMANI esports organization, the BEMANI PRO LEAGUE. It was confirmed that DDR would be included in the future as a tournament league. The league held a pre-season exhibition in February 2023, with announcements of sponsor teams and player drafts to take place in April 2023. The regular season is slated to begin in late Spring.

As exercise
Many news outlets have reported how playing DDR can be good aerobic exercise; some regular players have reported weight loss of 10–50 pounds (5–20 kg). Although the quantity of calories burned by playing DDR have not been scientifically measured, the amount of active movement required to play implies that DDR provides at least some degree of healthy exercise, and is an effective part of a balanced workout routine.

Many home versions of the game have a function to estimate calories burned, given a player's weight. Additionally, players can use "workout mode" to make a diary of calories burned playing DDR and any self-reported changes in the player's weight. The latest arcade release, DanceDanceRevolution A3, tracks calories burned per song, as well as the total calories burned by the player for the day. Additionally, the game's interface showcases the equivalent food to the amount of burned calories (such as a banana, a bowl of rice, and spaghetti carbonara).

Use in schools
At the start of 2006, Konami announced that the DDR games would be used as part of a fitness program to be phased into West Virginia's 765 state schools, starting with its 103 middle schools, over the next two years. The program was conceived by a researcher at West Virginia University's Motor Development Center.

California Institute of Technology allows its students to use DDR to fulfill part of its physical education requirement, as students may design their own fitness program.

University of Kansas has a class for Dance Dance Revolution open for students to take as a 1 credit hour course.

Cyber Coach has sold in excess of 600 systems in schools in the UK and features the DDR-inspired game Disco Disco 2.

Awards
The success of the Dance Dance Revolution series has resulted in two Guinness World Records: "Longest Dance Dance Revolution Marathon" which is currently held by Alex Skudlarek at 16 hours, 18 minutes, and nine seconds. and "Most Widely Used Video Game in Schools."

In Popular Culture
Drew Barrymore and Hugh Grant are both seen trying their hands at the home version in the 2007 romantic comedy Music and Lyrics. While Drew's character seems to do well in front of her niece and nephew, Hugh's has a little trouble keeping pace and ends up teaching the kids(and their dad) his old band's trademark dance moves.

The game is seen just inside Litwak's arcade in the 2012 animated film Wreck-It Ralph. Early in the film, game character Yuni Verse watches Mr. Litwak leave for the night, so she alerts all other video game characters that the arcade is closed, and it's time for their after-hours lives.

Film
On October 2, 2018, Deadline reported that Cara Fano would be supervising the production of a film based on the series. The report states that the film “will explore a world on the brink of destruction where the only hope is to unite through the universal language of dance.” Stampede Ventures and Branded Pictures Entertainment have partnered to produce the film. Producers J. Todd Harris and Marc Marcum are also working with Konami on the project.

See alsoDance Evolution, a Kinect gameDance Revolution, a television series inspired by Dance Dance RevolutionList of Dance Dance Revolution video games
Dance pad
Exergaming
List of Dance Dance Revolution songs
Chris Chike
Carrie Swidecki

NotesDance Dance Revolution 2ndMix spin-offs include Dance Dance Revolution 2ndMix Link Version, Dance Dance Revolution 2ndMix with Beatmania IIDX Club Version and Dance Dance Revolution 2ndMix and Beatmania IIDX Substream Club Version 2''.

References

External links
Konami: Dance Dance Revolution

Bemani games
Konami franchises
 
Video game franchises
Video game franchises introduced in 1998